South Bloomfield Township is one of the sixteen townships of Morrow County, Ohio, United States.  The 2010 census found 1,752 people in the township, 161 of whom lived in the village of Sparta.

Geography
Located in the southeastern corner of the county, it borders the following townships:
Chester Township - north
Wayne Township, Knox County - northeast corner
Liberty Township, Knox County - east
Milford Township, Knox County - southeast corner
Hilliar Township, Knox County - south
Porter Township, Delaware County - southwest corner
Bennington Township - west
Harmony Township - northwest corner

The village of Sparta is located in northern South Bloomfield Township.

Name and history
South Bloomfield Township was organized in 1817. Bloomfield is a descriptive name for the wildflowers which were once frequent there. It is the only South Bloomfield Township statewide.

Government
The township is governed by a three-member board of trustees, who are elected in November of odd-numbered years to a four-year term beginning on the following January 1. Two are elected in the year after the presidential election and one is elected in the year before it. There is also an elected township fiscal officer, who serves a four-year term beginning on April 1 of the year after the election, which is held in November of the year before the presidential election. Vacancies in the fiscal officership or on the board of trustees are filled by the remaining trustees.

References

External links
County website

Townships in Morrow County, Ohio
Townships in Ohio
1817 establishments in Ohio
Populated places established in 1817